Purl or wormwood ale is a drink.

Purl may also refer to:

 Persistent uniform resource locator
 Personalized Uniform Resource Locator
 Package URL
 Linda Purl, an American actress
 Purl stitch (knitting)
 Purl (2019 film), a 2019 animated short by Pixar Animation Studios
 A character in Bitz & Bob, the one that have rollerskates.

See also 
 Pearl (disambiguation)
 Perl (disambiguation)
 Perle (disambiguation)
 Perles (disambiguation)